was a Japanese waka poet of the early Kamakura period. He was also an accomplished kemari player. and one of his poems was included in the Ogura Hyakunin Isshu.

Among his grandchildren was the poet Masaari. He made a private collection, the Asukai-shū, which was posthumously edited by his grandson in 1292. Twenty-two of his poems were included in the Shin Kokin Wakashū, and a total of 134 in the imperial anthologies.

Political career

Masatsune served three emperors, Go-Toba, Tsuchimikado and Juntoku, in addition to working under the Kamakura shogunate.

Poetry
He served as one of the compilers of the Shin Kokin Wakashū, along with Shunzei's son Teika. Some twenty-two of his own poems were included in the imperial collection. A total of 134 of his poems were included in it and later imperial collections.

The following poem by him was included as No. 94 in Teika's famous Ogura Hyakunin Isshu:

References

Bibliography
McMillan, Peter. 2010 (1st ed. 2008). One Hundred Poets, One Poem Each. New York: Columbia University Press.
Suzuki Hideo, Yamaguchi Shin'ichi, Yoda Yasushi. 2009 (1st ed. 1997). Genshoku: Ogura Hyakunin Isshu. Tokyo: Bun'eidō.

12th-century Japanese poets
13th-century Japanese poets
People of Heian-period Japan
People of Kamakura-period Japan
Asukai family

Hyakunin Isshu poets
Japanese poets of the Heian period